Namaquamyia is a genus of wormlion in the family Vermileonidae, containing a single species, Namaquamyia manselli.

References

Diptera of Africa
Monotypic Brachycera genera
Taxa named by Brian Roy Stuckenberg
Vermileonomorpha